Nam-e Nik (also Romanized as Nām-e Nīk and Nām Nīk; also known as Nāmīn, Nānik, and Nānīn) is a village in Rezvan Rural District, Kalpush District, Meyami County, Semnan Province, Iran. At the 2006 census, its population was 2,682, in 588 families.

References 

Populated places in Meyami County